Yucca treculeana Carrière is a plant in the family Asparagaceae, native to Texas, New Mexico and Coahuila. Common names include Spanish dagger, Spanish bayonet and Don Quixote's lance.

Yucca treculeana is a large, tree-like species up to 10 m (33 feet) tall, often branching above the ground. Leaves are up to 128 cm (50 inches) long. Flowers are cream-colored, sometimes tinged with purple. Fruits are fleshy and succulent, up to 19 cm (7.5 inches) long.

In the last three generations, it has experienced a population decline of 30 percent, attributable due to habitat loss.

Some sources list this species as "Yucca spinosa Kunth."  However, the type specimen for this name at the herbarium in Berlin appears to be Dasylirion sp., thus rendering the name a "nomen confusum."

References

treculeana
Plants described in 1858
Flora of the South-Central United States
Flora of Northeastern Mexico